The women's 4 × 400 metres relay at the 2013 World Championships in Athletics was held at the Luzhniki Stadium on 16–17 August.

Summary
After giving up .08 in reaction time at the start, Jessica Beard split 50.79 to give the United States the early lead. By the time Natasha Hastings broke, she had a clear lead of more than 10 meters over the Tatyana Firova from Russia in second place. But after a 49.88 lap by Hastings (Firova obviously much faster than that), the Russian team had pulled even at the handoff. Kseniya Ryzhova went around the outside of Ashley Spencer and into the lead. Ryzhova opened up as much as a 2-meter lead, but by the home stretch, Spencer had gained that back and passed Ryzhova on the inside.  But Ryzhova fought back to a slight lead. With the American team in second place coming off the turn, Francena McCorory was waiting in lane 2.  Spencer had to cross behind Ryzhova to hand off. It was 400-meter bronze medalist Antonina Krivoshapka against 6th placer Francena McCorory, with Great Britain anchored by gold medalist Christine Ohuruogu a distant third. Krivoshapka opened up about a 5-meter lead on the back stretch, but McCorory looked to run within herself and came back to pass Krivoshapka on the home stretch. But Krivoshapka fought back, retaking the lead and holding it across the finish.  Ohuruogu found herself challenged by Floria Gueï on the backstretch but ran away from her on the home stretch for a clear third place.

In 2016, Russia's anchor runner Antonina Krivoshapka's samples from the 2012 Olympics were retested and found to contain turinabol. In 2017 she was given a two-year ban including this race and Russia was disqualified.  All teams advanced one place. The IAAF conducted the medal ceremony at the 2017 World Championships.

Records
Prior to the competition, the records were as follows:

Qualification standards

Schedule

Results

Heats
Qualification: First 2 of each heat (Q) plus the 2 fastest times (q) advance to the final.

Final
The final was started at 19:30.

References

External links
4 x 400 metres relay results at IAAF website

4 x 400 metres relay
Relays at the World Athletics Championships
2013 in women's athletics